= Ringette at the 2007 Canada Games =

Ringette was a women's competition event at the 2007 Canada Games, held at the Canada Games Centre in Whitehorse, Yukon.

== Women's ==
Division A
Province	Games	W	L	Points
Alberta	3	3	0	6
Manitoba	3	2	1	4
Saskatchewan	3	1	2	2
New Brunswick	3	0	3	0

Division B
Province	Games	W	L	Points
Ontario	4	4	0	8
Quebec	4	3	1	6
British Columbia	4	2	2	4
Nova Scotia	4	1	3	2
Prince Edward Island	4	0	4	0

== Finals round ==
Quarter-finals
British Columbia	4
Manitoba	5
New Brunswick	3
Ontario	10
Alberta	8
Nova Scotia	1
Quebec	8
Saskatchewan	1

Semi-finals
Manitoba	4
Ontario	5
Alberta	5
Quebec	3

Final
Ontario	9
Alberta	2
Third place
Quebec	2
Manitoba	1
